The All India United Democratic Front (also known as AIUDF and Sarva Bharatiya Sanyukt Ganatantric Morcha) is a political party active in the Indian state of Assam. It is the 3rd largest political party in Assam Legislative Assembly after BJP and INC.

The party was founded by Maulana Badruddin Ajmal on 3 October 2005 and at that time, its name was Assam United Democratic Front (AUDF). It was relaunched as a national party under its current name at a press meet in New Delhi on 2 February 2009, again with the Badruddin Ajmal as the party's leader. The party is headquartered in Guwahati.

The AIUDF is a key opposition party in Assam, which is the voice of millions of Bengali Muslims from Lower Assam and Barak Valley. It won 18 of 126 seats in the 2011 Legislative Assembly election and in 2016 it won 13 of 126 seats.
In 2021 Assam Assembly Election, Congress and AIUDF formed grand alliance along with BPF and communist parties. The alliance fought against BJP led NDA. AIUDF increase its tally and win 16 of 126 seats in the 2021 Legislative assembly election of Assam. However its alliance Mahajhot couldn't get majority enough to form government.

Election history

See also
 List of political parties in India

References

External links
 

 
2005 establishments in Assam
Political parties established in 2005